Aldo Leopold Nature Center is an independent, non-profit nature center located in Monona, Wisconsin.

The visitor center features hands-on exhibits about wetland, woodland, and prairie ecosystems in the Nature Nook and the Climate Science Education Center features exhibits about renewable energy, climate science and sustainability. The Climate Science Education Center opened in 2012, with an exhibit about global warming that was donated to the center by the Koshland Science Museum in Washington, D.C.

The Aldo Leopold Nature Center's environmental education programs include Wonder Bugs (a safe and fun introduction to the natural world for preschool-aged children and parent/caregiver), Vacation Day and Homeschool programs, School Field Trip programs, Summer Camps, Scout programs, Family public programs, special events, and adult and teacher workshops.

Nature Net, created by the Aldo Leopold Nature Center, is the Southern Wisconsin Environmental Learning Network of non-profit organizations that offer experiential, place-based environmental education. It offers resources for teachers and families to help connect children with nature.

Established in 1994, the organization is named for Wisconsin conservationist Aldo Leopold and its mission is "to engage and educate current and future generations, empowering them to respect, protect, and enjoy the natural world."

References

External links
Official website

Protected areas of Dane County, Wisconsin
Nature centers in Wisconsin
Buildings and structures in Dane County, Wisconsin
Education in Dane County, Wisconsin